This is a list of public art in Newport, Rhode Island, in the United States. This list applies only to works of public art on permanent display in an outdoor public space. For example, this does not include artworks in museums. Public art may include sculptures, statues, monuments, memorials, murals, and mosaics.

Newport, Rhode Island
Public art
Newport
Public art